Michael D. Lundy is a retired United States Army lieutenant general. He last served as commanding general of the United States Army Combined Arms Center, dual-hatted as commandant of the United States Army Command and General Staff College, deputy commanding for combined arms of the United States Army Training and Doctrine Command and commanding general of Fort Leavenworth from June 1, 2016 to December 16, 2019. He previously served as commanding general of the United States Army Aviation Center of Excellence and Fort Rucker from March 2014 to April 2016. He retired in 2020 after 33 years of distinguished service.

Lundy was commissioned as a second lieutenant via the ROTC training program at McNeese State University in 1987, where he earned a Bachelor of Science and majored in botany. He attended the United States Army Command and General Staff College and the United States Army War College, the latter of which he received an M.S. degree in strategic studies.

In February 2020, Lundy became a senior mentor for USACAC's Mission Command Training Program. He is married to Paula and has two daughters.

Dates of rank

References

External links
Volunteering Through the Seasons by Paula Lundy

Living people
Date of birth missing (living people)
Year of birth missing (living people)
McNeese State University alumni
United States Army Command and General Staff College alumni
United States Army War College alumni
Recipients of the Distinguished Service Medal (US Army)
Recipients of the Legion of Merit
Commandants of the United States Army Command and General Staff College
United States Army generals